The Transcaucasian mole vole (Ellobius lutescens) is a species of rodent in the family Cricetidae.

It is found in Armenia, Azerbaijan, Georgia, Iran, and Turkey.

Chromosomes

The karyotype has a low, odd, diploid number, 2n = 17,X. Transcaucasian mole voles have no SRY gene or Y chromosome; both sexes have an XO sex chromosome set, a state possibly derived from an ancestral population in which males had an XX sex chromosome set, like E. tancrei. Their sex-determination method remains unknown.

See also
Zaisan mole vole
Tokudaia osimensis
Tokudaia tokunoshimensis

References

Ellobius
Rodents of Asia
Vole, Transcaucasian Mole
Mammals of Azerbaijan
Mole Vole, Transcaucasian
South Caucasus
Mammals described in 1897
Taxa named by Oldfield Thomas
Least concern biota of Asia
Taxonomy articles created by Polbot